FK Utenis Utena is a professional football club, based in Utena, Lithuania. The club plays its home matches at the Utenis Stadium (capacity 3,000).

In 2020, FK Utenis Utena will participate in the II Lyga. As due to financial difficulties in 2019 the shareholders voted to withdraw from participation in the I Lyga.

Name history

 1933 – Utenis Utena
 1946 – Žalgiris Utena
 1948 – Vienybė Utena
 1948 – Žalgiris Utena
 1955 – Spartakas Utena
 1957 – Nemunas Utena
 1965 – FK Utenis Utena

History
FK Utenis founded in 1933. In 2014. the team was refounded. In the I Lyga, they were in third position and was promoted to the A lyga.

In 2015, 2016, 2017 seasons, the club spent in the top division of Lithuania, but by the end of 2017, they had financial problems and after end of the season decided to play next season in I Lyga.

In the 2018 I Lyga, the team finished in 8th position. However, due to financial difficulties the shareholders voted to withdraw from participation in 2019 I Lyga and will play in 2019 II Lyga.

Stadium

Utenis Stadium is a multi-purpose stadium in Utena, Lithuania. The stadium was renovated using funds from the European Union and opened on September 5, 2013. It is currently used mostly for football matches and is the home stadium of FK Utenis Utena.

Kit
From the establishment of the club, Utenis colours are blue and white, therefore the kit is blue/white variation of shirt, shorts and socks. Away kits are usually plain white or blue.

Kit manufacturers

Sponsors

Participation in Lithuanian championships

Current squad
Updated 2 August 2018

 
 
|-----
! colspan="9" bgcolor="#B0D3FB" align="left" |
|----- bgcolor="#DFEDFD" 
 
 
 
 
 
|-----
! colspan="9" bgcolor="#B0D3FB" align="left" |
|----- bgcolor="#DFEDFD"

|-----
! colspan="9" bgcolor="#B0D3FB" align="left" |
|----- bgcolor="#DFEDFD" 

 
|-----
! colspan="9" bgcolor="#B0D3FB" align="left" |
|----- bgcolor="#DFEDFD"

Staff

Coaches

 Mindaugas Čepas (Jan, 2014–May 7, 2016 )
 Oleh Boychyshyn (May 7, 2016 – January 9, 2017)
 Zvezdan Milošević (January 9, 2017 – April 26, 2017)
 Oleh Boychyshyn (April 26, 2017 – May 15, 2017)
 David Campaña Piquer (May 15, 2017– November 2017)
 Egidijus Varnas (Since 2018)

Partnership

 HB Køge

References

External links
 

 
Football clubs in Lithuania
Sport in Utena
1933 establishments in Lithuania
FK Utenis Utena